Jakarta XML Binding (JAXB; formerly Java Architecture for XML Binding) is a software framework that allows Java  EE developers to map Java classes to XML representations. JAXB provides two main features: the ability to marshal Java objects into XML and the inverse, i.e. to unmarshal XML back into Java objects. In other words, JAXB allows storing and retrieving data in memory in any XML format, without the need to implement a specific set of XML loading and saving routines for the program's class structure. It is similar to xsd.exe and XmlSerializer in the .NET Framework.

JAXB is particularly useful when the specification is complex and changing. In such a case, regularly changing the XML Schema definitions to keep them synchronised with the Java definitions can be time consuming and error-prone.

JAXB is one of the APIs in the Java EE platform (formerly Java EE), part of the Java Web Services Development Pack (JWSDP), and one of the foundations for WSIT. It was also part of the Java SE platform (in version Java SE 6-10). As of Java SE 11, JAXB was removed. For details, see JEP 320.

JAXB 1.0 was released in 2003, having been developed under the Java Community Process as JSR 31. In 2006 JAXB 2.0 was released under JSR 222 and Maintenance Release 2 released in December 2009. Reference implementations for these specifications were available under the CDDL open source license at java.net.

Usage 
The tool "" can be used to convert XML Schema and other schema file types (as of Java 1.6, RELAX NG, XML DTD, and WSDL are supported experimentally) to class representations. XML list sequences are represented by attributes of type . Marshallers and Unmarshallers are created through an instance of JAXBContext.

In addition, JAXB includes a "" tool that can essentially perform the inverse of "", creating an XML Schema from a set of annotated classes.

Default data type bindings 
The table below lists the mappings of XML Schema (XSD) data types to Java data types in JAXB.

Versions
 Java SE 9: JAXB 2.3.0  (in module java.xml.bind; this module is marked as deprecated )
 Java SE 8: JAXB 2.2.8 
 Java SE 7: JAXB 2.2.3 (JSR 222, maintenance release 2) 
 Java SE 6: JAXB 2.0 (JSR 222)

See also
 XML data binding
 JiBX – one of the fastest XML data binders 
 XMLBeans – a similar and complementary technology to JAXB from Apache Software Foundation
 TopLink – an object to relational and object to XML mapper from Oracle that supports JAXB 1.0
 EclipseLink MOXy – open source implementation of JAXB and object XML mapping services under the Eclipse Foundation
 Liquid XML Studio – Commercial tool for XML data binding code generation
 Simple XML Serialization – An alternative to JAXB, enabling rapid development of XML configuration and communication systems

References

External links
  Reference Implementation on Project GlassFish
 previous JAXB home page
 original JAXB home page
 A JAXB Tutorial by Wolfgang Laun
 JSR 222 (JAXB 2.0)
 JSR 31 (JAXB 1.0)
 The Java EE 5 Tutorial - Binding between XML Schema and Java Classes JAXB chapter of the Java EE 5 Tutorial
 JAXB Wizard 
 JAXB Tutorials

Articles
 JAXB 2.0 offers improved XML binding in Java
 XML and Java technologies: Data binding, Part 2: Performance

Java API for XML
Java specification requests